Miss Philippines Earth 2002 (also called simply as Miss Philippines 2002) was the 2nd edition of the Miss Philippines Earth pageant. It was held on May 12, 2002 at the University of the Philippines Theater in Quezon City, Philippines.

The event was broadcast by ABS-CBN Network in the Philippines and The Filipino Channel internationally. Carlene Aguilar crowned her successor April Ross Perez as Miss Philippines 2002 at the conclusion of the event. Perez won against 23 other women and became the representative of Philippines to the Miss Earth international beauty pageant.

The pageant
The 24 candidates were selected through regional competitions. In the National Capital Region, 12 candidates were chosen from 108 aspirants. The remaining 12 other official candidates were winners of regional Miss Philippines pageants organized by Carousel Productions through its network of franchise holders.

The candidates were formally presented to the media on May 2, 2002 at the poolside of the Intercontinental Hotel.

Ateneo de Zamboanga University student April Ross Perez, who stood 5 feet and 8 inches, was proclaimed winner of the Miss Philippines Earth 2002 against Justine Gabionza. Initially, the eleven judges cast the same number of votes for the top 2 of the five finalists and a second round of voting was conducted and revealed 6 yeas for Perez and 5 yeas for Gabionza.

The pageant switched its broadcasting television partner from RPN Channel to ABS-CBN Channel. The final show was directed by Johnny Manahan and hosted by Pia Guanio and Bobby Yan.

Results

Special awards

 Major Special Awards
 Minor/Sponsor Special Awards

Contestants
The following is the list of the official contestants of Miss Philippines Earth 2002 representing various regions in the Philippines:

Judges
The judging panel consisted of eleven judges as follows:

Environmental activities
The candidates visited various universities in Metro Manila to raise funds and engage in tree planting activities with the Philippine Department of Environment and Natural Resources.

The candidates also joined the Metropolitan Manila Development Authority in the campaign to promote waste sorting in several cities and municipalities in the Metropolitan Manila area.

See also
Miss Earth 2002

References

External links
Official Website
Lil' Earth Angels Official Website

2002
2002 beauty pageants
2002 in the Philippines
May 2002 events in the Philippines